Wheeling can refer to:

Places in the United States of America
Wheeling, Illinois
Wheeling, Carroll County, Indiana
Wheeling, Delaware County, Indiana
Wheeling, Gibson County, Indiana
Wheeling, a populated place in Winn Parish, Louisiana where Thomas Simpson Woodward lived
Wheeling, Missouri
Wheeling, West Virginia
Wheeling Creek (Ohio), a tributary of the Ohio River in West Virginia
Wheeling Creek (West Virginia)
Wheeling Island in the Ohio River

Other uses
Wheeling (electric power transmission)
Wheeling (see breaking wheel), a form of torture
"Wheeling", an American slang term for off-roading, a type of off-road motorsport
Wheeling, a technique for the cold forming of sheet metal into complex shapes using the English wheel
The Wheeling, common short name for the Wheeling and Lake Erie Railway (1990)
Fort Wheeling or simply Wheeling, a comics series by Hugo Pratt
Lottery Wheeling
Wheeling Jesuit University

See also
Wheel (disambiguation)